Mount Tripp is a massive, cone-shaped, ice-covered mountain, 2,980 m, standing between Hoffman and Hewitt Glaciers, 7 miles (11 km) west-northwest of Rhodes Peak in the Holland Range. Discovered by the British Antarctic Expedition (1907–09) and named for Leonard O.H. Tripp, of New Zealand, who gave assistance to this expedition and also to Shackleton's expedition of 1914–17.

Mountains of the Ross Dependency
Shackleton Coast